Paul Iselin Wellman (October 15, 1895 — September 17, 1966) was an American journalist, popular history and novel writer,  and screenwriter, known for his books of the Wild West: Kansas, Oklahoma, Great Plains.  Hollywood movies Cheyenne (1947) with Jane Wyman, The Walls of Jericho (1948) with Kirk Douglas, The Iron Mistress (1952) with Alan Ladd as Jim Bowie, Jubal (1956) with Ernest Borgnine and Rod Steiger, and The Comancheros (1961) with John Wayne and Lee Marvin are based on Wellman novels.

Wellman's brother, Manly Wade Wellman, was also a well published author, as was his father, Frederick Creighton Wellman under the pseudonym Cyril Kay-Scott. Another brother, Frederick Lovejoy Wellman, was a noted plant pathologist.

Literary works

Death on the Prairie, 1934
Death in the Desert, 1935
Broncho Apache, 1936
Jubal Troop, 1939
The Trampling Herd: The Story of the Cattle Range in America, 1939
Angel with Spurs, 1942
The Bowl of Brass, 1944
The Walls of Jericho, 1947
Death on Horseback, 1947 (combines Death on the Prairie & Death in the Desert)
The Indian Wars of the West, 1947 (formerly Death on Horseback)
The Chain,  1949 
The Iron Mistress, 1951
The Comancheros, 1952
The Female, A Novel of Another Time, 1953
Glory, God and Gold, 1954
The Blazing Southwest, The Pioneer Story of the American Southwest, 1954
Jericho’s Daughters, 1956
Portage Bay, 1957
Ride the Red Earth, 1958
The Fiery Flower, 1959
Indian Wars and Warriors—East, 1959
Indian Wars and Warriors—West, 1959
Gold in California, 1958 
Stuart Symington, 1960
Race to the Golden Spike, 1961
A Dynasty of Western Outlaws, 1961
Magnificent Destiny, 1962
The Greatest Cattle Drive, 1964
Spawn of Evil, 1964
The Devil’s Disciples, 1965
The House Divides: The Age of Jackson and Lincoln, 1966
The Buckstones, 1967

References

External links
 
 
 

1895 births
1966 deaths
20th-century American historians
American male non-fiction writers
American male screenwriters
20th-century American male writers
20th-century American screenwriters